Richthofen Pass is a pass, 1 nautical mile (1.9 km) wide, between Mount Fritsche and the rock wall north of McCarroll Peak, on the east coast of Graham Land. Discovered and photographed in 1902 by the Swedish Antarctic Expedition under Nordenskjold, who named it Richthofen Valley for Baron Ferdinand von Richthofen, German geographer and geologist. The feature was found to be a pass by the Falkland Islands Dependencies Survey (FIDS) in 1955.

Further reading 
 NATIONAL GEOSPATIAL-INTELLIGENCE AGENCY, Springfield, Virginia, Antarctica, P 109

External links 

 Richthofen Pass on USGS website
 Richthofen Pass on SCAR website

References 

Mountain passes of Graham Land
Oscar II Coast